Korskrogens IK is a sports club in Korskrogen, Sweden, established in 1931.

The women's soccer team played three seasons in the Swedish top division between 1978–1980.

References

External links
Korskrogens IK 

1931 establishments in Sweden
Football clubs in Gävleborg County
Sport in Gävleborg County
Association football clubs established in 1931